The 2015–16 Four Hills Tournament took place at the four traditional venues of Oberstdorf, Garmisch-Partenkirchen, Innsbruck and Bischofshofen, located in Germany and Austria, between 29 December 2015 and 6 January 2016.

Peter Prevc won the competition ahead of Severin Freund and Michael Hayböck. By winning the tournament, Prevc became the second ski jumper from Slovenia to win it after Primož Peterka in 1996–97. This was the first tournament since 2007–08 which was not won by an Austrian ski jumper, ending the seven-year streak of the Austrian team.

Results

Oberstdorf
 HS 137 Schattenbergschanze, Germany
29 December 2015

Garmisch-Partenkirchen
 HS 140 Große Olympiaschanze, Germany
1 January 2016

Innsbruck
 HS 130 Bergiselschanze, Austria
 3 January 2016

Bischofshofen
 HS 140 Paul-Ausserleitner-Schanze, Austria
 6 January 2016

Overall standings
The final standings after all four events:

References

External links 
 

2015-16
2015 in ski jumping
2016 in ski jumping
2015 in German sport
2016 in German sport
2016 in Austrian sport